The United States ambassador to Syria is the official representative of the president of the United States to the president of Syria.

From the partitioning of the Ottoman Empire in 1922 until 1944,  had been under the control of France as 
a part of the League of Nations Mandate for Syria and the Lebanon. The United States appointed George Wadsworth as agent and consul general to Syria and Lebanon on October 9, 1942, to provide a quasi-diplomatic presence in Damascus until the United States determined that Syria achieved effective independence in 1944. The United States recognized Syria as an independent state on September 8, 1944, when the Syrian Minister of Foreign Affairs, Jamil Mardam Bey, informed the United States that Syria fully recognized and would protect existing rights of the United States and its nationals. This Syrian assurance was in response to a letter sent on September 7, 1944, by the U.S. diplomatic agent and consul general in Syria that offered "full and unconditional recognition" upon receipt of such written assurances. The United States established diplomatic relations with Syria when George Wadsworth presented his credentials as Envoy Extraordinary and Minister Plenipotentiary on November 17, 1944. Wadsworth was concurrently the envoy to Syria and Lebanon while resident in Beirut.

Egypt and Syria united to form a new state, the United Arab Republic (UAR) on February 22, 1958 with its capital in Cairo. The U. S. recognized the UAR and the embassy in Damascus was reclassified as a consulate general. Syria seceded from the Union in 1961 and U. S.–Syria diplomatic relations were reestablished on October 10, 1961. The consulate general was once again elevated to embassy status.

Syria severed diplomatic relations with the U.S. on June 6, 1967 in the wake of the 1967 Arab-Israeli War. In the interim a U.S. Interests Section in Syria was established on February 8, 1974, in the Italian Embassy with Thomas J. Scotes as Principal Officer. Normal relations were resumed in 1974.

The U. S. recalled its ambassador to Syria in 2005 after the assassination of Rafic Hariri. A series of chargés d’affaires represented the U.S. until the appointment of Robert Stephen Ford in January 2011.

Ambassadors and chiefs of mission

See also
Embassy of Syria, Washington, D.C.
Syria – United States relations
Foreign relations of Syria
Ambassadors of the United States

References

United States Department of State: Background notes on Syria

External links
 United States Department of State: Chiefs of Mission for Syria
 United States Department of State: Syria
 United States Embassy in Damascus

Syria
United States Ambassadors